Storeton is a small village on the Wirral Peninsula, England. It is west of the town of Bebington and is made up of Great Storeton and Little Storeton, which is classified as a hamlet. At the 2001 Census the population of Storeton was recorded as 150.

History
Storeton has Viking connections, the name deriving from the Old Norse Stor-tún, meaning "great farmstead".

The village is mentioned in the Domesday Book of 1086 as Stortone.

It has been thought that the poem Sir Gawain and the Green Knight refers to Storeton Hall. Storeton Hall dates from the 14th century.

Storeton was a township in Bebington Parish of the Wirral Hundred. The population was 180 in 1801, 233 in 1851, 265 in 1901 and 325 in 1951.

In October 1944 a USAAF Liberator Bomber number 42-50347 from the 445th Bombardment Group exploded without explanation over the fields between Little Storeton and Landican, with the loss of all 24 servicemen on board. The dead included 15 commissioned officers who were being taxied back to Tibenham after seeing more than 30 successful combat missions.  In recent years a memorial stone has been erected by a local man who witnessed the aftermath of the crash as a teenager.  The stone is coloured in the USAAF colours blue and yellow, with 24 yellow bricks each representing a life lost.

Geography

Storeton Woods
On the ridge above the village Storeton Woods, owned by the Friends of Storeton Woods and covering . The woods were purchased in 1989 after a campaign by the local Green Party as there were concerns about the deteriorating condition of the woods and the possibility that the land might be bought by developers. The trust later also attempted to purchase the adjacent Hancock's Wood to extend the nature reserve by a further , but the deal with the Leverhulme estate fell through at the last minute. Although the offer remains open there is the concern that this could lead to the eventual development of the area of woodland for housing.

Storeton Woods is also the location for Storeton Transmitting Station, a television relay and radio transmitter and mast.

Storeton quarries and tramway 
The woods have grown up on the site of a quarry present since the times of the Roman occupation. A portion of the tramway embankment still exists as footpath and a section of the rails have been re-installed by the Bromborough Society. Some rails were embedded at a former level crossing on Rest Hill Road until 1979 when they were buried under a new layer of tarmac. The tramway ran along the southern border of the current woods, into Hancock's Wood and through a tunnel under Mount Road. It then ran in a sweeping curve to Bromborough. 
Much of the route of the tramway can no longer be seen as it has been lost under housing development or levelled for the playing fields of Wirral Grammar School but the present Quarry Road and Quarry Road East in Bebington follow the track of Storeton Tramway and the original tunnel under the Chester to Birkenhead railway line is still in use as footpath opposite the end of Quarry Road East.

Most of the village is built from locally quarried stone from Storeton Ridge.  The stone is a creamy sandstone and, according to the British Geological Survey, was also used for Roman tombstones and on Birkenhead Town Hall (in Hamilton Square), Lime Street station, Lever House in Port Sunlight, and Sankey Viaduct in Cheshire. The quarry was also the site of the discovery of dinosaur footprints. The species was named Chirotherium storetonense after the site of discovery. Examples of these footprints can be seen in World Museum Liverpool in Liverpool and the Williamson Art Gallery in Birkenhead, and also in Christ Church, Kings Road, Higher Bebington.

The quarry was filled in with spoil from the excavation of the Queensway Tunnel in the 1920s and the site is currently a tranquil nature reserve enjoyed by walkers.

Transport

Bus
Services operating in the Storeton area, as of 8 December 2014:

Railway
The Borderlands Line passes between Storeton and Barnston, to the west. Storeton railway station opened in 1896. However, due to its isolation, the station was closed to passengers in 1951, closed completely in 1964 and later demolished.

See also
Listed buildings in Storeton

References

Sources

Bibliography

External links

 Friends of Storeton Woods

Towns and villages in the Metropolitan Borough of Wirral